Narsingi is an Indian satellite town of Hyderabad in Ranga Reddy district of Telangana state. It is in the administrative headquarters of Gandipet mandal. Several high rise residential towers like My Home Avatar, PWS 7 Hills etc. are located in Narsingi. The Outer Ring Road, Hyderabad has a junction there.

Demographics
 India census, Narsingi had a population of 9449 of which 4,551 are males while 4,898 are females as per report released by Census India 2011. Narsingi has an average literacy rate of 78.30%, higher than state average of 67.02%. In Narsingi, male literacy is around 80.89% while female literacy rate is 75.96%. In Narsingi, 14% of the population is under 6 years of age.

References 

Cities and towns in Ranga Reddy district